Eagle Island is one of several islands around the peninsula known as Graham Land, which is closer to South America than any other part of that continent. It is an island in the continent of Antarctica, separated from the Antarctic mainland by the 1.77 km wide Aripleri Passage. It is volcanic in origin, having been K-Ar dated 1.7 ± 0.2 and 2.0 ± 0.2 million years old. It forms part of the James Ross Island Volcanic Group.

During the Southern Hemisphere summer of 2019-2020 three melting events occurred on Trinity peninsula, in November 2019, January 2020, and particularly February 6- February 11, 2020, during which 106 millimeters of snow melted, forming melt ponds on Eagle Island.

The nine day heatwave in early February 2020 melted about 20% of the island's snow cover.

Map
 Trinity Peninsula. Scale 1:250000 topographic map No. 5697. Institut für Angewandte Geodäsie and British Antarctic Survey, 1996.

See also
Physical impacts of climate change
Scree Peak

References

Islands of Trinity Peninsula
Volcanic islands
Pleistocene volcanoes